The Commissioner of Public Works was a member of Cabinet of the Government of South Australia.

Originally created for the Finniss Ministry on 24 October 1856, there were 63 holders of the public works portfolio. It was known as Commissioner for Public Works for most of its existence, however since the Playford Government in the 1960s, it was known as Minister for Works or Public Works.

The longest holder was Malcolm McIntosh, a member of the Liberal Federation/Liberal and Country League and a minister in the Butler and Playford governments, who held the portfolio on two separate occasions for a total of 23 years and 45 days. The last holder was Kym Mayes, a member of the Labor Party and a minister in Lynn Arnold's government.

List of Commissioner of Public Works of South Australia

References
 Former Members of the Parliament of South Australia (Parliament of South Australia)

South Australian ministries
1856 establishments in Australia